Değirmendere is a Turkish place name meaning "mill river" and may refer to:

Places
 Değirmendere, Alanya, a village in Alanya district of Antalya Province
 Değirmendere, Amasya, a village in the central district of Amasya
 Değirmendere, Balya, a village
 Değirmenderesi, Bolu, a village in the central district of Bolu Province
 Değirmendere, Ceyhan, a village in Ceyhan district of Adana Province
 Değirmendere, Çorum
 Değirmendere, Ergani
 Değirmendere, Gölcük, a former town and modern quarter in Gölcük district of Kocaeli Province
 Değirmendere, İspir
 Değirmendere, Mersin, a village in Toroslar district of Mersin Province

Other uses
 TCG Değirmendere (A-576), a tugboat of the Turkish Navy